Bangladesh became a full member of the International Cricket Council (ICC) on 26 June 2000, and played its first Test match against India later that year. Before then, it had been an associate member of the ICC since 1977, competing in six ICC Trophies, the leading One Day International (ODI) competition for non-Test playing nations. The country has enjoyed some success in ODI's and Twenty20 Internationals (T20I) since its promotion, but has struggled to perform in the Test match arena. Recent years have seen the nation improve tremendously however, and it is beginning to establish itself as a powerful force in the cricketing world.

Men's cricket

Test captains
This is a list of cricketers who have captained the Bangladesh national cricket team for at least one Test match.

One-Day International captains
This is a list of cricketers who have captained the Bangladesh national team for at least one One Day International.

 Last updated: 6 March 2023 (as of 3rd ODI match between  v )

Twenty20 International captains

This is a list of cricketers who have captained the Bangladesh national team in at least one Twenty20 International.

 Last Updated: 06 November 2022 (as of  Vs Pakistan T20 World Cup 2022)

Women's cricket

Women's ODI captains
This is a list of cricketers who have captained the Bangladesh women's cricket team for at least one Women's One Day International.

 Last updated 31 July 2022.

Women's T20I captains
This is a list of cricketers who have captained the Bangladesh women's cricket team for at least one Women's Twenty20 International.

 Last updated 31 July 2022.

Youth cricket

Under-19s test captains
This is a list of cricketers who have captained the Bangladeshi Under-19 cricket team for at least one Under-19 Test match.

 Last updated: 31 July 2022

Under-19s ODI captains
This is a list of cricketers who have captained the Bangladeshi Under-19 cricket team for at least one Under-19 One Day International. The table of results is complete to the third Under-19 ODI against India in 2020 Under-19 Cricket World Cup. Bangladesh's greatest success in the Under-19 World Cup has been winning the title in 2020 beating India in the final. Bangladesh also won the plate which is the competition for teams failing to progress past the first qualifying round of the Under-19 World Cup. They achieved this in both 1997/8 and 2003/4, and during the latter tournament, beating Australia in doing so.

 Last updated 31 July 2022

ICC Trophy
The ICC Trophy is the leading one-day tournament from non-Test teams, and Bangladesh participated in the tournament before they gained Test status. This is a list of the men who captained Bangladesh in the ICC Trophy.

See also
List of Bangladeshi Test cricketers
List of Bangladeshi ODI cricketers

References

External links

National team captains
Bangladesh
Captains